Hallwang is a municipality in the district of Salzburg-Umgebung in the state of Salzburg in Austria.

References

Cities and towns in Salzburg-Umgebung District